Gerardina Anna Allegonda Martina Hooft (1894-1994) was a Dutch painter know for her still lifes.

Biography 
Hooft was born on 27 January 1894 in The Hague. She studied at the Akademie van beeldende kunsten (Den Haag) (Royal Academy of Art, The Hague), Académie de la Grande Chaumière (Paris) and De .

Hooft's work was included in the 1939 exhibition and sale Onze Kunst van Heden (Our Art of Today) at the Rijksmuseum in Amsterdam. She was a member of Arti et Amicitiae and the Pulchri Studio.

Hooft died on 30 March 1994 in Laren, North Holland at the age of 100.

Her work is in the Kunstmuseum Den Haag and the Rijksmuseum.

References

External links
images of Hooft's art on Invaluable

1894 births
1994 deaths
Artists from The Hague
20th-century Dutch women artists
Dutch painters
Dutch centenarians
Women centenarians